Peter Andrew Shirtliff (born 6 April 1961) is an English football coach and former player. As a player, he made more than 500 appearances in the Football League playing as a central defender for Sheffield Wednesday, Charlton Athletic, Wolverhampton Wanderers, Barnsley and Carlisle United. He has managed Mansfield Town, and is currently employed as first-team coach at Swindon Town.

Career
Shirtliff was born in Hoyland, near Barnsley. He began his football career with Sheffield Wednesday, where in two spells with the club he achieved promotion from the Second Division in 1983–84, a third-place finish in the First Division in the 1991–92 season, and a League Cup-winners' medal in 1991, but missed the 1993 League Cup and FA Cup finals with a broken arm. He played more than 350 games for the club in all competitions. After his first spell with Wednesday, he joined Charlton Athletic, where his two goals in the last 10 minutes of extra time in the 1986–87 playoff final replay against Leeds kept the club in the First Division. He also played for Wolverhampton Wanderers, Barnsley and Carlisle United).

Shirtliff retired from the game in 1997, shortly after helping Barnsley reach the Premier League, after 18 years as a professional footballer. He has since been youth team coach at Barnsley and Leicester City. In 2005, he was appointed assistant manager at Mansfield Town. He became the manager of Mansfield following the dismissal of Carlton Palmer in September 2005, and lasted 15 months in the job before getting sacked in December 2006 following a poor run of results.

In 2007, he was appointed assistant manager at Tranmere Rovers, and two years later took up the equivalent post at Swindon Town. He was also assistant manager and caretaker manager of Bury before departing in 2013.

Personal life
His younger brother Paul was also a professional footballer.

Honours
Sheffield Wednesday
 League Cup: 1991

References

External links
 
 

Living people
1961 births
People from Hoyland
Association football central defenders
Footballers from Barnsley
English footballers
Premier League players
Sheffield Wednesday F.C. players
Charlton Athletic F.C. players
Wolverhampton Wanderers F.C. players
Barnsley F.C. players
Carlisle United F.C. players
English football managers
Mansfield Town F.C. managers
Sportspeople from Yorkshire
Tranmere Rovers F.C. non-playing staff
Swindon Town F.C. non-playing staff
Bury F.C. non-playing staff
Oldham Athletic A.F.C. non-playing staff